St. Gregorios Orthodox Church, Velamcode is a parish church in the Malabar Diocese of the Malankara Orthodox Syrian Church. The church is established in the name of St. Gregorios (Parumala Thirumeni).

The relic of Saint Gregorios (part of the Holy vestments) was brought from Parumala and installed at the church.

Malankara Sabha
 Malankara Sabha History
 Malankara Orthodox Syrian Church
 Orthodox Church TV
 Orthodox Herald
 MOSC
 Catholicate News

Malankara Orthodox Syrian church buildings
Churches in Kozhikode district